Odostomia megerlei is a species of sea snail, a marine gastropod mollusc in the family Pyramidellidae, the pyrams and their allies.

Description
The shell grows to a length of 1.5 mm

Distribution
This species occurs in the following locations:
 European waters (ERMS scope)
 Portuguese Exclusive Economic Zone
 Spanish Exclusive Economic Zone
 United Kingdom Exclusive Economic Zone
 Mediterranean Sea

References

External links
 
 To Biodiversity Heritage Library (1 publication)
 To CLEMAM
 To Encyclopedia of Life
 To World Register of Marine Species

megerlei
Gastropods described in 1886